The county of West Yorkshire is divided into five Metropolitan Boroughs. The metropolitan boroughs of West Yorkshire are Leeds, Wakefield, Kirklees, Calderdale and Bradford.

As there are 413 Grade II* listed buildings in the county they have been split into separate lists for each borough.

 Grade II* listed buildings in Leeds
 Grade II* listed buildings in Wakefield
 Grade II* listed buildings in Kirklees
 Grade II* listed buildings in Calderdale
 Grade II* listed buildings in Bradford

See also
 Grade I listed buildings in West Yorkshire

References

 
Lists of Grade II* listed buildings in West Yorkshire